"Tanibhanga is a village in Bangladesh with population of less than one thousand". "The village is under Jodda Union, Nangalkot Upazila in Comilla District".

See also
 List of villages in Bangladesh

References

Populated places in Cumilla District
Villages in Comilla District
Villages in Chittagong Division